Carnegie Free Library is a historic Carnegie library building located at Connellsville, Fayette County, Pennsylvania. It was designed and built in 1901, with funds partly provided by the philanthropist Andrew Carnegie. Carnegie provided $50,000 toward the construction of the Connellsville library. The grant was commissioned by Carnegie on April 22, 1899; it was the 13th library that he commissioned in America. It is a two-story Ohio buff stone structure with basement in the Italian Renaissance Revival style. The exterior features a terra cotta cornice and red Spanish tile roof.

It was added to the National Register of Historic Places in 1981.

References

External links

Carnegie Free Library website

Library buildings completed in 1901
Libraries on the National Register of Historic Places in Pennsylvania
Historic American Buildings Survey in Pennsylvania
Neoclassical architecture in Pennsylvania
Carnegie libraries in Pennsylvania
Buildings and structures in Fayette County, Pennsylvania
National Register of Historic Places in Fayette County, Pennsylvania
1901 establishments in Pennsylvania